The Culgoa River is a river that is part of the Darling catchment within the Murray–Darling basin and is located in South West Queensland.

Course and features
The river is a continuation of the western branch of the Balonne River in southern Queensland, near Dirranbandi, and flows generally south-west across parts of the Darling Riverine Plains, joined by ten tributaries, including the Balonne and Birrie rivers, before forming its confluence with the Darling River near Bourke; descending  over its  course.

Cubbie Station, located on the Culgoa River, is situated adjacent to a large diversion channel which permits the farm, under licence to store  of river water. According to downstream farmers in 2008, large cotton farms, such as Cubbie Station, have reduced the traditional flow of the Culgoa River by one third. By 2009, downstream farmers where claiming that due to upstream water entitlements on the Culgoa River, since 2000, the Lower Balonne floodplain had not received enough water to flood the plains. Prior to the granting of these rights, the Lower Balonne River flooded every two or three years; impacting the sustainability of flora, fauna, birdlife, and economic returns from grazing livestock and cropping.

Little Culgoa Creek, an anabranch of the Culgoa River, leaves the river near Goodooga and returns to the river near Brenda Gate. The river flows through the Culgoa Floodplain National Park and the Culgoa National Park, located  respectively north and south of the border between Queensland and New South Wales, west of Goodooga.

Etymology
Culgoa is an Aboriginal word meaning "running through" or "returning".

See also

 
 
 Rivers of New South Wales

References

External links
 
 

Rivers of Queensland
Tributaries of the Darling River
South West Queensland
Shire of Balonne
Brewarrina Shire
Bourke Shire